Timothy Howard St George Byng, 11th Viscount Torrington, born 13 July 1943, is a British peer.

He succeeded his grandfather, Arthur Byng, 10th Viscount Torrington (1876–1961).

Byng has three daughters and no sons. His title, through male primogeniture, will likely pass to a distant Canadian cousin.

References

External links

1943 births
Living people
Viscounts in the Peerage of Great Britain

Torrington